Jonáš Forejtek won the boys' singles tennis title at the 2019 US Open, defeating Emilio Nava 6–7(4–7), 6–0, 6–2 in the final.

Thiago Seyboth Wild was the defending champion, but he is no longer eligible to participate in junior events.

Seeds

Main draw

Finals

Top half

Section 1

Section 2

Bottom half

Section 3

Section 4

Qualifying

Seeds

Qualifiers

Draw

First qualifier

Second qualifier

Third qualifier

Fourth qualifier

Fifth qualifier

Sixth qualifier

Seventh qualifier

Eighth qualifier

External links 
 Draw

Boys' Singles
US Open, 2019 Boys' Singles